Abramyan (Abraamyan) (Armenian: Աբրահամյան) is an Armenian surname. Notable people with the surname include:

Ara Abramyan (born 1957), Armenian-Russian businessman
Evgeny Aramovich Abramyan (1930–2014), Armenian physicist

See also
Abrahamian
Abrahamyan

Armenian-language surnames